Diu Head or Diu Point is a headland in the Arabian Sea.  
It is located at the southern end of the Kathiawar Peninsula in the Union Territory of Dadra and Nagar Haveli and Daman and Diu, India, close to the town of Diu and 17 km southeast of Kodinar town.

There is a lighthouse station on the point.

See also 
Diu, India

References

External links
Sailing Directions: West Coast of India, Sector 2: Diu Head to Cape Rama

Headlands of India
Landforms of Gujarat
Diu district